Marco Pérez (born 21 March 1978) is a former international footballer from Liechtenstein who last played as a midfielder for ASK-BSC Bruck/Leitha.

Club career
Perez played his youth football with FC Triesen and moved to FC Vaduz in 1993. He advanced to their first team, in the third tier of Swiss football, in the 1996–97 season.

Perez joined FC Basel's first team for their 1997–98 season under head coach Jörg Berger. After playing in two test games Perez played his domestic league debut for his new club in the home game in the St. Jakob Stadium on 15 August 1997 as Basel won 2–1 against Aarau. He scored his first goal for his club on 21 March 1998 in the home game against Xamax, but he could not help the team, because Basel were defeated 3–6. 

In Basel's 1999–2000 season Perez did not come to much playing time, so in the winter break he was loaned out to SR Delémont, who at that time were in the Nationalliga A/B Playoff-round against relegation. In the following season Perez played in 4 friendly matches, but the moved on to FC Wangen b. O.. During his time with the club, Perez played a total of 95 games for Basel, scoring a total of 6 goals. 62 of these games were in the Nationalliga A, two in the Swiss Cup, six in the UI Cip and 25 were friendly games. He scored five goals in the domestic league and the other was scored during the test games.

After playing for FC Wangen b. O., Perez returned to FC Vaduz, where he played for five seasons in the second tier of Swiss football. He played 130 league games and won the Liechtenstein Football Cup six times. 

Then Perez moved to Austria, first to SC Eisenstadt for one season, then to First Vienna FC also for one season and then to Wiener Sport-Club where he played regularly for six seasons. Finally, he moved to ASK-BSC Bruck/Leitha, which was where he ended his active football career. He was later employed by FC Karabakh as coach for their youth teams.

International
Making his debut (and ultimately his only appearance for Liechtenstein) in a friendly against Germany in 1996, Pérez managed to score a goal in his sole international foray, a 9-1 thrashing at the hands of Die Mannschaft.

International goals
Scores and results list Liechtenstein's goal tally first.

Personal life
Pérez was born in Switzerland, in Grabs, Switzerland, to a Spanish mother and a Slovene father (although he did not take his surname or citizenship, as his parents were not married).

References

Sources
 Rotblau: Jahrbuch Saison 2017/2018. Publisher: FC Basel Marketing AG. 
 Die ersten 125 Jahre. Publisher: Josef Zindel im Friedrich Reinhardt Verlag, Basel. 
 Verein "Basler Fussballarchiv" Homepage

1978 births
Living people
People from the canton of St. Gallen
Liechtenstein footballers
Liechtenstein international footballers
Liechtenstein people of Spanish descent
Liechtenstein people of Slovenian descent
Spanish people of Slovenian descent
Swiss people of Spanish descent
Swiss people of Slovenian descent
FC Vaduz players
FC Basel players
SR Delémont players
FC Wangen bei Olten players
SC Eisenstadt players
First Vienna FC players
Wiener Sport-Club players
Association football midfielders
Liechtenstein expatriate footballers
Expatriate footballers in Austria